Verkhneye Turovo is a rural locality (a selo) and the administrative center of Verkhneturovskoye Rural Settlement, Nizhnedevitsky District, Voronezh Oblast, Russia. The population was 1,384 as of 2018. There are 18 streets.

Geography 
Verkhneye Turovo is located 25 km northeast of Nizhnedevitsk (the district's administrative centre) by road. Kurbatovo is the nearest rural locality.

References 

Rural localities in Nizhnedevitsky District